Chileutomia is a genus of medium-sized sea snails, marine gastropod mollusks in the family Eulimidae.

Species
The species within this genus include the following:
 Chileutomia neozelanica (Powell, 1940)
 † Chileutomia paulensis Lozouet, 1999
 † Chileutomia subvaricosa (Tate & Cossman, 1898)

Species brought into synonymy
 Chileutomia corallina (Hedley, 1912): synonym of  Oceanida corallina (Hedley, 1912).

References

 Lozouet, P., 1999. Nouvelles espèces de gastéropodes (Mollusca: Gastropoda) de l'Oligocène et du Miocène inférieur d'Aquitaine (sud-ouest de la France). Partie 2. Cossmanniana 6(1-2): 1-68

External links
 To World Register of Marine Species

Eulimidae